“Hot Sub” is the second episode of the ABC situation comedy television series Miss Guided. It was written by Kevin Etten and directed by Todd Holland It aired March 20, 2008.

Cast

Guest starring
Ashton Kutcher - Beaux
Jamie Lynn Spears - Mandy
Scotch Ellis Loring - Mr. Shoemaker

Co-Starring
Angel Laketa Moore - Staffer
Robin Kreiger - Secretary
Mikey Reid - Roger
Travis Caldwell - Michael
Maia Madison - the Female Janitor

Episode Summary
A substitute teacher is drafted in to teach the Advanced Spanish class causing trouble for both Tim and Becky.

Cultural references
Beaux plays Becky Glory of Love by Peter Cetera to try to win her affections.
Bruce tells Tim to "..make like Robin Williams and improvise" when he and Principal Huffy make a surprise evaluation of his Spanish lessons.
Beaux also quotes from Good Will Hunting to convince Mandy not to attend College.

References

2008 American television episodes